McLean National Wildlife Refuge is a  National Wildlife Refuge (NWR) in the U.S. state of North Dakota. A little less than half the acreage of McLean NWR is on public lands, while the rest is an easement refuge and is on privately owned land, but the landowners and U.S. Government work cooperatively to protect the resources. The U.S. Fish and Wildlife Service oversees McLean NWR from their offices at Audubon National Wildlife Refuge. Originally called Lake Susie NWR, the name of the refuge was changed to its current title in the 1990s.

References

External links
 Oh Ranger: McLean NWR

Protected areas of McLean County, North Dakota
National Wildlife Refuges in North Dakota
Easement refuges in North Dakota
Mandan, Hidatsa, and Arikara Nation